Morse is a former provincial electoral division  for the Legislative Assembly of the province of Saskatchewan, Canada, centered on the town of Morse, Saskatchewan. The district was created before the 3rd Saskatchewan general election in 1912, and abolished before the 23rd Saskatchewan general election in 1995. It was the riding of Premier Ross Thatcher.

It is now part of the Lumsden-Morse, Swift Current, and Wood River constituencies.

Members of the Legislative Assembly

Election results

|-

|Conservative
|Henry M. Klassen
|align="right"|548
|align="right"|38.48%
|align="right"|–
|- bgcolor="white"
!align="left" colspan=3|Total
!align="right"|1,424
!align="right"|100.00%
!align="right"|

|Conservative
|Henry Edmund Houze
|align="right"|871
|align="right"|19.32%
|align="right"|-19.16

|Independent
|John F. Wiebe
|align="right"|659
|align="right"|14.62%
|align="right"|–
|- bgcolor="white"
!align="left" colspan=3|Total
!align="right"|4,508
!align="right"|100.00%
!align="right"|

|- bgcolor="white"
!align="left" colspan=3|Total
!align="right"|Acclamation

|-

|- bgcolor="white"
!align="left" colspan=3|Total
!align="right"|3,800
!align="right"|100.00%
!align="right"|

|-

|- bgcolor="white"
!align="left" colspan=3|Total
!align="right"|Acclamation
!align="right"|

|-

|style="width: 130px"|Conservative
|Richard Percy Eades
|align="right"|2,814
|align="right"|51.51%
|align="right"|-

|- bgcolor="white"
!align="left" colspan=3|Total
!align="right"|5,463
!align="right"|100.00%
!align="right"|

|-

|Conservative
|Richard Percy Eades
|align="right"|1,752
|align="right"|29.70%
|align="right"|-21.81

|Farmer-Labour
|John McCaig
|align="right"|1,430
|align="right"|24.24%
|align="right"|–
|- bgcolor="white"
!align="left" colspan=3|Total
!align="right"|5,899
!align="right"|100.00%
!align="right"|

|-

|CCF
|Henry Peter Thiessen
|align="right"|1,808
|align="right"|27.55%
|align="right"|+3.31

|Conservative
|Clifford B. Martin
|align="right"|1,416
|align="right"|21.58%
|align="right"|-8.12

|- bgcolor="white"
!align="left" colspan=3|Total
!align="right"|6,563
!align="right"|100.00%
!align="right"|

|-

|style="width: 130px"|CCF
|Sidney M. Spidell
|align="right"|2,763
|align="right"|49.25%
|align="right"|+21.70

|Prog. Conservative
|Clifford B. Martin
|align="right"|725
|align="right"|12.92%
|align="right"|-8.66
|- bgcolor="white"
!align="left" colspan=3|Total
!align="right"|5,610
!align="right"|100.00%
!align="right"|

|-

|style="width: 130px"|CCF
|Jim Gibson
|align="right"|3,006
|align="right"|46.15%
|align="right"|-3.10

|Prog. Conservative
|Rupert D. Ramsay
|align="right"|1,098
|align="right"|16.85%
|align="right"|+3.93
|- bgcolor="white"
!align="left" colspan=3|Total
!align="right"|6,514
!align="right"|100.00%
!align="right"|

|-

|style="width: 130px"|CCF
|Jim Gibson
|align="right"|3,069
|align="right"|45.75%
|align="right"|-0.40

|Prog. Conservative
|John Kinchen Rosa
|align="right"|481
|align="right"|7.17%
|align="right"|-9.68
|- bgcolor="white"
!align="left" colspan=3|Total
!align="right"|6,709
!align="right"|100.00%
!align="right"|

|-

|style="width: 130px"|CCF
|Jim Gibson
|align="right"|3,263
|align="right"|56.58%
|align="right"|+10.83

|- bgcolor="white"
!align="left" colspan=3|Total
!align="right"|5,767
!align="right"|100.00%
!align="right"|

|-

|style="width: 130px"|CCF
|Jim Gibson
|align="right"|2,590
|align="right"|42.55%
|align="right"|-14.03

|- bgcolor="white"
!align="left" colspan=3|Total
!align="right"|6,087
!align="right"|100.00%
!align="right"|

|-

|CCF
|Robert Davis
|align="right"|2,629
|align="right"|39.83%
|align="right"|-2.72

|Prog. Conservative
|George Gurney
|align="right"|523
|align="right"|7.92%
|align="right"|-
|- bgcolor="white"
!align="left" colspan=3|Total
!align="right"|6,600
!align="right"|100.00%
!align="right"|

|-

|CCF
|Paul W. Beach
|align="right"|2,952
|align="right"|48.08%
|align="right"|+8.25
|- bgcolor="white"
!align="left" colspan=3|Total
!align="right"|6,140
!align="right"|100.00%
!align="right"|

|-

|NDP
|Louis H. Lewry
|align="right"|2,398
|align="right"|36.96%
|align="right"|-11.12

|Prog. Conservative
|Earl Cooper
|align="right"|694
|align="right"|10.70%
|align="right"|-
|- bgcolor="white"
!align="left" colspan=3|Total
!align="right"|6,488
!align="right"|100.00%
!align="right"|

|-

|NDP
|Paul W. Beach
|align="right"|2,783
|align="right"|44.28%
|align="right"|+7.32
|- bgcolor="white"
!align="left" colspan=3|Total
!align="right"|6,285
!align="right"|100.00%
!align="right"|

|-

|NDP
|James R. Murdoch
|align="right"|2,274
|align="right"|40.22%
|align="right"|-4.02

|Progressive Conservative
|Edward Nasserden
|align="right"|680
|align="right"|12.03%
|align="right"|-
|- bgcolor="white"
!align="left" colspan=3|Total
!align="right"|5,654
!align="right"|100.00%
!align="right"|

|-

|NDP
|Reg Gross
|align="right"|2,502
|align="right"|36.44%
|align="right"|-3.78

|Progressive Conservative
|Harold Martens
|align="right"|1,847
|align="right"|26.90%
|align="right"|+14.87
|- bgcolor="white"
!align="left" colspan=3|Total
!align="right"|6,866
!align="right"|100.00%
!align="right"|

|-

|style="width: 130px"|NDP
|Reg Gross
|align="right"|2,587
|align="right"|37.97%
|align="right"|+1.53

|Progressive Conservative
|Harold Martens
|align="right"|2,203
|align="right"|32.33%
|align="right"|+5.43

|- bgcolor="white"
!align="left" colspan=3|Total
!align="right"|6,814
!align="right"|100.00%
!align="right"|

|-

|style="width: 130px"|Progressive Conservative
|Harold Martens
|align="right"|3,565
|align="right"|49.94%
|align="right"|+17.61

|NDP
|Reg Gross
|align="right"|2,409
|align="right"|33.75%
|align="right"|-4.22

|- bgcolor="white"
!align="left" colspan=3|Total
!align="right"|7,138
!align="right"|100.00%
!align="right"|

|-

|style="width: 130px"|Progressive Conservative
|Harold Martens
|align="right"|3,694
|align="right"|56.12%
|align="right"|+6.18

|NDP
|Reg Gross
|align="right"|2,209
|align="right"|33.56%
|align="right"|-0.19

|- bgcolor="white"
!align="left" colspan=3|Total
!align="right"|6,582
!align="right"|100.00%
!align="right"|

|-

|style="width: 130px"|Progressive Conservative
|Harold Martens
|align="right"|2,682
|align="right"|44.42%
|align="right"|-11.70

|NDP
|Carl Siemens
|align="right"|2,101
|align="right"|34.80%
|align="right"|+1.24

|- bgcolor="white"
!align="left" colspan=3|Total
!align="right"|6,038
!align="right"|100.00%
!align="right"|

See also
Electoral district (Canada)
List of Saskatchewan provincial electoral districts
List of Saskatchewan general elections
List of political parties in Saskatchewan
Morse, Saskatchewan

References
 Saskatchewan Archives Board – Saskatchewan Election Results By Electoral Division

Former provincial electoral districts of Saskatchewan